President of the Council can refer to:
President of the Council of State (head of state)
President of the Council of Ministers (head of government)
Lord President of the Council (a role relating to UK Privy Council)
President of the Council of Government, a position in the First Philippine Republic aka Malolos Republic as stipulated by the 1899 Constitution of the Philippines on Title IX